Nur Hazwani Afiqah binti Helmi (born 29 January 1997) is a Malaysian singer-songwriter, TV personality, humanitarian activist, model, actress, producer and who is better known as a Muslimah Beatboxer. She started writing songs at the age of 13 after a week of guitar lessons. Hazwani's first piece titled "Jom Zikir" which she wrote independently was published in Heliza Helmi's album #JOM (2013). She began her work in the entertainment industry at a young age and was regarded as one of the industry's youngest songwriters. She was a runner in Astro Oasis' reality TV show, "Gema Gegar Vaganza" Season 2 in 2018 with a duo group known as The Helmis.

Early life 
Hazwani was born in Hospital Besar Kuala Terengganu during the last ten nights of Ramadan. She was the youngest out of four siblings (two sisters and a brother) in her family. She then was raised in Tawau, Sabah for 11 years from the age of 3 until 14 years old. From 2002 to 2003, she received her early education at Tawau Pre-Islamic School. Hazwani then furthers her primary education in SK Holy Trinity and Tawau Primary Islamic School from 2004 until 2009. She completed her secondary school studies at SMK Tawau before moving to Kuala Lumpur two years later. She then managed to graduate from high school in SMK Perimbun majoring in art stream (accounting). At the end of the 2015–2016 academic year, she resumed her studies at IIUM's Centre for Foundation Studies. Finally, she graduated from her bachelor's degree in Psychology from International Islamic University Malaysia in 2021 and had her graduation ceremony in August 2022.

Hazwani's older sister, Heliza Helmi, encouraged her to go over her boundaries, which aligned with Hazwani's life philosophy of "Nothing is impossible because Allah will make the impossible possible for you." At the age of 16, she worked as a personal assistant and gave motivational speeches. After completed her Sijil Pelajaran Malaysia (SPM) test in 2014, her attention gradually moved to humanitarian activity, and she began to participate in a number of humanitarian trips. Hazwani took a semester off from her university to participate in humanitarian efforts because she believes that learning may take place outside of the classroom and that humanitarian missions can create opportunities for learning and create transformation.

Career

2011–2020 (The Beginnings)

Modelling and voiceover career
Other than being active in the entertainment and humanity industry, Hazwani has expanded her career into the modelling field. She became a model for the official campaign for HelizaGuzelHive. The campaign was filmed in New Zealand (2016). Apart from that, she was also invited to become a model for Scarftan, Rayyan Hayya for Ramadan campaign (2019) and Cacas (2021). Over and above, she has done a voiceover for a Malaysian commercial product, Susu Ilham (2019).

Ayat Cinta Dari Tuhan 
This is one of Hazwani's projects that she has buckled down wholeheartedly. It was her first time doing it all in the making of music progress. She was a lyricist, composer, music arranger and director for this single. Ayat Cinta Dari Tuhan is a song that she composed based on a real story that was inspired by an anonymous person. Hence, Ayat Cinta dari Tuhan was produced in 2019.

Discography

Single
 "Jom Selawat" (2015)
 "Ayat Cinta Dari Tuhan" (2019)
 "Allahumarhamna bil Quran" (2019)
 "Bila Aku Sudah Tiada" (2021)
 "Rawat" (2022)

Album
 Jom (2015)

Filmography

Series

Movie

Television

Humanitarian works

Rescue Syria Humanitarian Aid Projects 

She was entrusted by Malaysian Consultative Council for Islamic Organization (MAPIM) to establish and take part in these humanitarian projects in Syria. MAPIM has focused several sectors in desperate need of emergency assistance. As of March 2017, the MAPIM Syrian Rescue Team has successfully distributed RM6,500,000 worth of donations from Malaysians to Syrians. This assistance is channeled directly through a series of humanitarian missions led by Dr Sani Araby Al-Kahery. The challenges facing the RescueSyria team are widely shared in local media writing as well as at local and overseas television station invitation slots. Among the successes of RescueSyria Assistance Mission (MAPIM) are:

 Built 24 water wells in 4 Syrian states and served over 250,000 residents.
 Delivered 15 Syrian emergency aid content
 Distributes 130,000 packs of bread to 100,000 Syrian families
 Send 7,000 winter blankets for refugees inside Syria
 Send 7,000 winter heaters to refugees in Syria
 ReActivate 23 schools in 4 states in Syria. The schools currently operate with a total student population of 15,000.
 Send 7 ambulances for use to 6 medical points and hospitals in Azaaz, Idleb, Aleppo, Hama -Syria.
 Establishes a maternity clinic called Malaysia Maternity & Paediatric Clinic For Syria to serve 2 states in Hama & Idleb  .
 Sponsors 6 hospitals in desperate need of medicines and medical equipment. 
 Rescue Syria team had successfully delivered 15 containers containing up to MYR 2 Million of crucial basic necessities for Syrian refugees in Syria.

Wake Up For Gaza Humanitarian Mission 

 Hazwani took part in giving awareness about the solidarity of Gazan People.
 Involved in all Ministry meetings in Gaza

Emergency Aid For Palu 

 Distributed 2000 grade A, food pack and 1000 hygiene utilities
 Delivered 2500 prayer pack which consists of prayer mat, prayer clothing, Quran and tasbih
 Built 10 water wells and water generator in a specific area in Palu, Indonesia.

International Conference 
Participant, "Third Conference of the League of “Parliamentarians For Al-Quds”  8 February 2020, officiated by Yang Amat Berhormat Tun Dr. Mahathir Mohamed, the Prime Minister of Malaysia

Honors 
  : 
 Lieutenant of Civil Defence Emergency Response Team (CDERT)(2022)

References

External links 
@hazwanihelmi Instagram
@hazwanihelmi Twitter

1997 births
Living people
Malaysian people of Malay descent
Malaysian Muslims
People from Terengganu
Malaysian singer-songwriters
Malaysian female models
Malaysian television presenters
Malaysian women television presenters
Malaysian activists
International Islamic University Malaysia alumni
Malaysian women singer-songwriters